The Story Makers is an educational children's television programme that was broadcast on the BBC's pre-school digital television network, CBeebies as well as being one of the launch programmes for the channel. The Story Makers is set in a children's library, and encourages literacy and creativity.

Programme
The programme starts as the library shuts in the evening.  At the stroke of midnight, Jackson and Jelly (pink and green puppets who live in the library and hide in the daytime) come out and are joined by a presenter, one of the members of the Wordsworth family, who recites "The sun is down, the stars are bright, Story Makers come out at night.” as they appear. The Wordsworths together with Jelly and Jackson are the Story Makers.

Objects found in the library or appear by magic are put into the top of the story machine (transformed from a desktop computer); Jelly, Jackson and the story maker then recite "Imagine, imagine, imagine a story!" and the story machine makes a book containing a story based on the object. The story in the book is then "read out" (although this is replaced on screen by live action or an animation). The first story is usually a Playbook (live action with small children) and the remaining stories are animated (cartoons, stop-motion animation or puppets). The characters in the stories are fairly consistent, including Sniff and Wag (two puppet dogs), Blue Cow (a cartoon cow, created by Blue-Zoo) and Kevin the Spaceman (puppet).  There is always a Blue Cow story and a Playbook – the other story varies between each episode.

As dawn begins and the sun rises the Story Maker takes his or her leave and recites "Dawn is upon us, the morning is nigh, we've made our stories and we bid you goodbye." and disappears. Jelly and Jackson hide and the story machine turns back into a computer, but the books produced overnight remain for the librarian and children to find when the library opens in the morning. In Series 2–4, Jelly and Jackson sometimes look at what the kids or the librarian are doing during the credits and hide to make it look like they are invisible to the humans (this never happened in Series 1).

Characters

Wordsworth Family Members
The main live action presenters are the Wordsworths:
Milton Wordsworth – Played by Danny John-Jules (appears in every series except Series 2).
Byron Wordsworth – Played by Michael Offei (appears in Series 2–4)
Shelley Wordsworth – Played by Lauretta Nkwocha (appears in Series 2–4)
Rossetti Wordsworth – Played by Dystin Johnson (appears in Series 2–4)
Webster Wordsworth – Played by Joe Vera (actor)|Joe Vera (appears in Series 2–4)
Blake Wordsworth – Played by Paul J. Medford (only appears in Series 4)

In Series 1, Milton Wordsworth was the only live action presenter.

Others
 The Librarian (appears at the beginning and end of the programme), (sometimes a woman, sometimes a man)
 Children in the library (appear at the beginning and end of the programme except series 1)
 Playbook children (appears in every series)
 Blue Cow appears in all of the episodes where she is always curious about the world outside her farm

Puppets
The show also featured two puppets:
 Jackson (voiced by Nick Mercer) is a pink horse and he is the adoptive big brother to Jelly, he wear pink velcros. He is 6 years old. 
 Jelly (voiced by Aliex Yuill) is a green porcupine who has some of her quills sticking out, she is Jackson's adopted younger sister. She is 3 years old.

The puppets have also appeared on CBeebies Springwatch and CBeebies Autumnwatch. Jelly was also a recurring character in Green Balloon Club (another show that aired on CBeebies).

In December 2007, Jelly & Jackson appeared as contestants on a puppet special of The Weakest Link hosted by Anne Robinson which was originally broadcast on Friday 28 December 2007 at 18:00GMT on BBC One, they were voted off after Round 6.

Home Media Releases
In 2004, two VHS tapes and DVDs containing episodes from the first series were released by the Contender Entertainment Group under license from the BBC. The first volume contained five episodes from the series, and the second release was a "Bumper Special", featuring ten episodes, five on each VHS tape/DVD.

Stories
All episodes feature a Playbook and Blue Cow story. The other story rotates from the list below:
Kevin the Spaceman (appears in every series)
Sniff and Wag (appears in every series)
Barnacle Rock (appears in Series 1–3)
Jack Sprat and Treacle Cat (only appears in Series 1)
Tales from Faraway (only appears in Series 1)
The Poons (only appears in Series 1)
Super Baby (only appears in Series 4)
The Three Bears (appears in Series 3–4)
Rainforest Tales (only appears in Series 2)

References

External Links
 
 
 

BBC children's television shows
2000s British anthology television series
British preschool education television series
British television shows featuring puppetry
British television series with live action and animation
2000s British children's television series
2002 British television series debuts
2000s preschool education television series
English-language television shows
CBeebies
Television series by BBC Studios